Herbert Penzl (September 2, 1910 in Neufelden, Austria – September 1, 1995 in Oakland, California), was an Austrian-born American philologist and historical linguist. He studied English Philology at the University of Vienna under Karl Luick. In 1934 he completed his Ph.D. dissertation The Development of Middle English a in New England Speech. He spent some time in the United States working on the Linguistic Atlas of the United States and Canada at Brown University, having been recommended for the exchange by Sigmund Freud. While in the US, he published his first article, "New England Terms for Poached Eggs," which received media coverage by the Associated Press among others.

After a brief return to Austria, he decided in 1936 to move to the United States permanently. He was appointed at Rockford College, Illinois (1936-1938). In 1938, he received an appointment at the University of Illinois, where he worked until 1950. In 1944 he became a naturalized US citizen and from 1943 to 1945 he served in the United States Army, working on the development of military dictionaries.

After the war, he worked on the publication of A Grammar of Pashto: A Descriptive Study of the Dialect of Kandahar, Afghanistan''' (1955). From 1950 to 1963, he taught at the University of Michigan. In 1963, he received an offer from the Linguistics Department at the University of California, Berkeley, where he spent the rest of his career.

Penzl's research included a wide variety of topics, but his main interests were Germanic historical phonology. He wrote over 250 research articles and published 11 books, many of which have become standard works for students of Germanic Philology. Penzl described himself as an "American-style Structuralist."

 Books 
 A Grammar of Pashto A Descriptive Study of the Dialect of Kandahar, Afghanistan 
 A Reader of Pashto 

 Honours 
Honorary Member of the Austrian Academy of Sciences (1991)

 Notable students 
Irmengard Rauch (UC Berkeley)

Laurel J. Brinton (UBC Vancouver)

 External links 
 OBITUARY - Herbert Penzl September 12, 1995, articles.sfgate.com

 References 

David Krogh (ed.) University of California: In Memoriam, 1995''. University of California, 1995, pp. 145–48.

1910 births
1995 deaths
Austrian emigrants to the United States
American philologists
Austrian philologists
Brown University people
Rockford University faculty
University of California, Berkeley faculty
University of Illinois Urbana-Champaign faculty
University of Michigan faculty
University of Vienna
People with acquired American citizenship
People from Oakland, California
Historical linguists
Linguists from Austria
Harvard University alumni
20th-century linguists
20th-century philologists